Harry Forrester may refer to:

Harry Forrester (coach) (1922–2008), American basketball and baseball coach
Harry Forrester (footballer) (born 1991), English footballer

See also
Henry Forrester (disambiguation)